The 2022 Cheez-It Bowl was a college football bowl game played on December 29, 2022, at Camping World Stadium in Orlando, Florida. The 33rd annual Cheez-It Bowl, the game featured Florida State from the Atlantic Coast Conference and Oklahoma from the Big 12 Conference. The game began at 5:35 p.m. EST and was aired on ESPN. It was one of the 2022–23 bowl games concluding the 2022 FBS football season. The game's title sponsor was Kellogg's through their Cheez-It brand.

Teams
Consistent with conference tie-ins, the game featured teams from the Atlantic Coast Conference (ACC) and the Big 12 Conference. This was the eighth meeting between Oklahoma and Florida State; the Sooners led the all-time series, 6–1.  It was the teams' fifth bowl game against each other, preceded by the 1965 Gator Bowl, 1980 Orange Bowl, 1981 Orange Bowl and the 2001 Orange Bowl (the latter of which saw the 2000 Sooners win the national championship).

Florida State

Florida State started the season hoping to at least make a bowl game after having gone 5–7 (4–4 ACC) in 2021. They had an easy win over Duquesne to start the season. The next week, they faced LSU in the first-ever edition of the Louisiana Kickoff, held at Caesars Superdome in New Orleans. The Seminoles won, 24–23, after they successfully blocked an extra point attempt from LSU that would have sent the game into overtime. They took a bye week before defeating their next two opponents, Louisville and Boston College, the latter in front of a sellout crowd. Florida State started the season with four conservative wins and entered the rankings at No. 23 before suffering three consecutive losses to ACC Atlantic foes No. 22 Wake Forest, No. 14 NC State, and No. 4 Clemson. However, they rebounded by handily defeating Georgia Tech, in-state rival Miami, Syracuse, and Louisiana, and defeated their other in-state rival, Florida, for the first time since 2017. The Seminoles recorded a second-place finish in the ACC Atlantic, as two of the teams they lost to—NC State and Wake Forest—both suffered conference losses of their own (and more Conference losses than Florida State) after beating Florida State; this allowed Florida State to place ahead of them in the division standings and get a better bowl bid. The Seminoles entered the bowl with a record of 9–3 (5–3 ACC) and ranked No. 13 in each of the major polls.

Oklahoma

Oklahoma completed their regular season with an overall 6–6 record, 3–6 in Big 12 games. After starting the season with three non-conference wins, The Sooners had three consecutive conference losses before winning their first conference game by beating Kansas. Oklahoma went on to finish the season with wins against Iowa State and Oklahoma State and losses to Baylor, West Virginia, and Texas Tech.

Game summary

Statistics

See also
 2023 Citrus Bowl, contested at the same venue on January 2, and also sponsored by Cheez-It

References

Cheez-It Bowl
Cheez-It Bowl
Florida State Seminoles football bowl games
Oklahoma Sooners football bowl games
Cheez-It Bowl
Cheez-It Bowl